"Mother and Child Reunion" is a 1972 song by Paul Simon.

Mother and Child Reunion may also refer to:

Television
 "Mother and Child Reunion" (Degrassi: The Next Generation), two-part episode of Degrassi: The Next Generation 
 "Mother and Child Reunion", episode of The Steve Harvey Show
 "Mother and Child Reunion" season 8 Happy Days episode
 "Mother and Child Reunion" season 32 The Simpsons episode

Other
 An occasional name for restaurant dishes that include both a chicken and egg, including oyakodon